Frederick Tom Brooks CBE FRS (17 December 1882 – 11 March 1952) was an English botanist and Professor of Botany at the University of Cambridge.

Life

Brooks was born in Wells, Somerset the son of Edward Brooks and attended Sexey's School, Somerset from 1895 to 1898. He then attended Merrywood Teacher Training College in Bristol.

He went up to Emmanuel College, Cambridge in 1902.

In 1907 he married Emily Broderick. They had no children.

From 1905 to 1917 he held the role of demonstrator in the botany department. During the First World War he had the role of plant pathologist in the Department of Food Production. From 1919 to 1931 he was a lecturer at Cambridge and from 1931 to 1936 a reader.

He became Professor of Botany at Cambridge in 1936. He specialised in mycology and investigated, amongst other things, silver-leaf disease of fruit trees. He was elected a Fellow of the Royal Society in 1930 and an Honorary Fellow of the Royal Society of Edinburgh in 1946. He was president of the Cambridge Philosophical Society from 1945 to 1947.

He died in Cambridge aged 70.

In 1956, Clifford Gerald Hansford circumscribed the genus Brooksia, a genus of fungi in the class Dothideomycetes and named in Frederick Tom Brooks honour.

Publications
Plant Diseases (1928)

Botanical reference

References

External links

1882 births
1952 deaths
People from Somerset
Fellows of the Royal Society
Honorary Fellows of the Royal Society of Edinburgh
Alumni of Emmanuel College, Cambridge
English botanists
Professors of Botany (Cambridge)
English mycologists
Commanders of the Order of the British Empire
People educated at Sexey's School